Dinosaur plant is a common name for several plants and may refer to:

Anastatica, native to deserts of North Africa
Pallenis hierochuntica, a sunflower in a genus native to the Mediterranean
Selaginella lepidophylla, native to North America

See also
Rose of Jericho (disambiguation)
Resurrection plant